The Brandt Centre (formerly the Regina Agridome) is an indoor arena at REAL District in Regina, Saskatchewan. Built in 1977, it is the home arena for the WHL's Regina Pats. It is owned by the city of Regina and operated by the Regina Exhibition Association Ltd. (REAL).

History

The venue has hosted various sporting events, including curling and hockey events, as well as concerts and other events. Beginning in 2012, it was home to the Regina Rage of the Legends Football League's Canadian division. Opened in 1977 as the Agridome, it was renamed Brandt Centre after the city sold naming rights to Regina-based farm equipment manufacturer Brandt Group.

In January 2015, the arena introduced a new scoreboard with ten video displays. Costing over $3 million, it is the largest suspended scoreboard in the province. In 2017, the Brandt Centre hosted Skate Canada International, and the following year, it hosted the 2018 Memorial Cup. The arena underwent renovations in preparation for Memorial Cup, including improvements to its boards, dressing rooms, and lighting. The city contributed $1 million in funding towards these upgrades.

References

External links

Indoor arenas in Saskatchewan
Indoor ice hockey venues in Canada
Regina Pats
Sports venues in Saskatchewan
Western Hockey League arenas
Music venues in Saskatchewan
Tourist attractions in Regina, Saskatchewan
Buildings and structures in Regina, Saskatchewan
Sport in Regina, Saskatchewan
1977 establishments in Saskatchewan
Sports venues completed in 1977